Edward Davis  was an Irish politician.

Davis  was born in County Fermanagh and educated at  Trinity College, Dublin.

Davis  represented Clogher from 1692 to 1693.

References

Irish MPs 1692–1693
Members of the Parliament of Ireland (pre-1801) for County Tyrone constituencies
18th-century Irish people
People from County Fermanagh
Alumni of Trinity College Dublin